Hayden Jonathan Shaw (born 31 August 1980) is a field hockey player from New Zealand.

Shaw was born in Christchurch. He earned his first cap for the national team, nicknamed The Black Sticks, in 2002 against Australia. Shaw was often involved in penalty corner routines performing drag flicks. As a result, he was top scorer with 13 goals at the 2002 Commonwealth Games whilst winning a silver medal with the national team. After the 2006 Men's Hockey World Cup, Shaw was selected for the World Cup All Star team.

He has played club hockey for HC 's-Hertogenbosch in the Netherlands. Shaw also played first-class cricket for Canterbury. He now works as a teacher at Pleasant Point Primary School in South Canterbury, having started in January 2019.

International senior tournaments
 2002 – World Cup
 2002 – Commonwealth Games
 2003 – Sultan Azlan Shah Cup
 2003 – Champions Challenge
 2004 – Olympic Qualifying Tournament
 2004 – Olympic Games
 2006 – Commonwealth Games
 2006 – World Cup
 2007 – Champions Challenge
 2008 – Olympic Games
 2010 – Commonwealth Games

References

External links
 

1980 births
Living people
New Zealand male field hockey players
New Zealand cricketers
Canterbury cricketers
Olympic field hockey players of New Zealand
Field hockey players at the 2004 Summer Olympics
Field hockey players at the 2008 Summer Olympics
2002 Men's Hockey World Cup players
2006 Men's Hockey World Cup players
Commonwealth Games silver medallists for New Zealand
Commonwealth Games bronze medallists for New Zealand
Commonwealth Games medallists in field hockey
Field hockey players at the 2002 Commonwealth Games
Field hockey players at the 2006 Commonwealth Games
Field hockey players at the 2010 Commonwealth Games
Medallists at the 2002 Commonwealth Games
Medallists at the 2010 Commonwealth Games
Field hockey players from Christchurch
People educated at Shirley Boys' High School
HC Den Bosch players
Expatriate field hockey players
New Zealand expatriate sportspeople in the Netherlands
South Island cricketers